Brian Walter Broadhurst (24 November 1938 – 2006) was an English professional footballer who played as a forward.

Career
Born in Sheffield, Broadhurst made seven Football League appearances for Chesterfield in season 1961–62, after signing from Yorkshire Football League club Hallam.

Daughter Joanne Broadhurst played football for England women's national football team, while Brian helped with coaching at her clubs Doncaster Belles and Croydon.

References

External links
Appearances at Neil Brown's

1938 births
2006 deaths
Association football forwards
English footballers
Chesterfield F.C. players
Heanor Town F.C. players
Hallam F.C. players
Footballers from Sheffield
English Football League players
Loughborough United F.C. players
Doncaster Rovers Belles L.F.C. managers
Leamington F.C. players
English football managers